Sheboygan is a city in and the county seat of Sheboygan County, Wisconsin, United States. The population was 49,929 at the 2020 census. It is the principal city of the Sheboygan, Wisconsin Metropolitan Statistical Area, which has a population of 118,034.

History
Before its settlement by European Americans, the Sheboygan area was home to Native Americans, including members of the Potawatomi, Chippewa, Ottawa, Winnebago, and Menominee tribes. In the Menominee language, the place is known as Sāpīwǣhekaneh, "at a hearing distance in the woods". The Menominee ceded this land to the United States in the 1831 Treaty of Washington. Following the treaty, the land became available for sale to American settlers. Migrants from New York, Michigan, and New England were among the first white Americans to settle this area in the 1830s, though the French had been present in the region since the 17th century and had intermarried with local people. One 19th century settler remarked: "Nearly all the settlers were from the New England states and New York." Lumbering was the first major industry, as trees were harvested and shipped to eastern markets through the Great Lakes.

Although Sheboygan was officially incorporated in 1846, much of the town had been platted in 1836, when property investors laid out more than one thousand lots.

By 1849, a wave of liberal, middle-class immigration triggered by the revolutions of 1848 had made the community known for its German population. As Major William Williams wrote on June 26, 1849: "Arrived at Sheboigin  on the Wisconsin side, a small town, population purhaps  from 700 to 1000. This is a promising place. There are a great many best class of Germans settling around it. 'Tis all along this Lake so far quite an interesting country." Between 1840 and 1890, Protestant Dutch immigrants also settled in the area, as did Irish refugees fleeing the Great Famine. A neighborhood in northwestern Sheboygan (between Martin Avenue and Alexander Court) was settled by Slovenian immigrants and acquired the name Laibach; it was also known as Vollrath's Division. In 1887, Sheboygan adopted a sundown town ordinance banning African Americans from living there, according to a local Optimist member's account in 1963, though city leaders denied that any such ordinance was in effect.

In the spring of 1898, Sheboygan elected Fred C. Haack and August L. Mohr as aldermen, making them the first two Social Democratic Party candidates to be elected to public office in the United States. Haack had originally been elected in 1897 as a member of the Populist Party but joined the Social Democrats after they organized locally. Haack served as alderman for sixteen years before moving to Milwaukee and being elected as a Socialist alderman there. At the 
1932 Socialist Party convention, Haack received recognition as the first Socialist officeholder in America.

In the early 20th century, many Orthodox Greeks, Catholic Slavs and Lithuanians immigrated to Sheboygan. In the late 20th century, Hmong refugees from Laos and Southeast Asia settled there.

Geography
It is located at latitude 43°45' north, longitude 87°44' west.

Climate

Sheboygan has a warm-summer humid continental climate typical of Wisconsin. In spite of its position on Lake Michigan there are vast temperature differences between seasons, although it is somewhat moderated compared with areas farther inland.

Demographics

2020 census
As of the census of 2020, the population was 49,929. The racial makeup of the city was 72.3% White, 11.1% Asian, 3.3% Black or African American, 0.6% Native American, 4.8% from other races, and 7.9% from two or more races. Ethnically, the population was 12.5% Hispanic or Latino of any race and 68.9% Non-Hispanic White.

2010 census
As of the census of 2010, there were 49,288 people, 20,308 households, and 12,219 families residing in the city. The racial makeup of the city was 82.5% White, 1.8% African American, 0.5% Native American, 9.0% Asian, 3.6% from other races, and 2.5% from two or more races. Hispanic or Latino of any race were 9.9% of the population.
 
There were 20,308 households, of which 30.7% had children under the age of 18 living with them, 43.4% were married couples living together, 11.7% had a female householder with no husband present, 5.1% had a male householder with no wife present, and 39.8% were non-families. Of all households 33.4% were made up of individuals, and 12.1% had someone living alone who was 65 years of age or older. The average household size was 2.38 and the average family size was 3.06.

The median age in the city was 36.2 years. 25.3% of residents were under the age of 18; 8.7% were between the ages of 18 and 24; 27.2% were from 25 to 44; 24.8% were from 45 to 64; and 13.9% were 65 years of age or older. The gender makeup of the city was 49.5% male and 50.5% female.

Hmong community

In 1976, the first three Hmong families settled in Sheboygan with the help of local refugee agencies such as the Grace Episcopal Church and Trinity Lutheran Church. They were refugees from Laos. By 1990, the city had 2,000 residents of Hmong descent. By December 1999, there were around 5,000 Hmong and Hmong American residents in Sheboygan, 65% of whom were under the age of 18.

In 2006, the Sheboygan Hmong Memorial was installed in the lakefront Deland Park to honor Hmong military and civilian contributions to the Secret War in Laos (particularly from 1961–1975). The 2010 U.S. Census showed the number of Hmong citizens to be around 4,100 people, putting it fourth in Wisconsin for Hmong populations.

Arts and culture

Bratwurst Days
Sheboygan County is well known for its bratwurst. The Sheboygan Jaycees sponsor Bratwurst Days, an annual fund-raising festival that includes the Johnsonville World Bratwurst Eating Championship.

Space
Sheboygan was the site of a proposed new spaceport called Spaceport Sheboygan.

Music
 The Chordettes, 1950s female group
 Morbid Saint, thrash metal band

Points of interest
 Above & Beyond Children's Museum
 Blue Harbor Resort
 Bookworm Gardens
 Ellwood H. May Environmental Park
 John Michael Kohler Arts Center
Quarry Beach

 Mead Public Library
 Plaza 8 (defunct)
 Sheboygan County Historical Museum
 Sheboygan Hmong Memorial
 Sheboygan Indian Mound Park
 Sheboygan Municipal Auditorium and Armory (demolished)
 Stefanie H. Weill Center for the Performing Arts

In April 1894, the schooner Lottie Cooper wrecked just off Sheboygan in a gale. The wreckage was found buried in the harbor during the construction of the Harbor Centre Marina and is now on display in Deland Park, on Sheboygan's lakefront. The free display is the only one of its kind on the Great Lakes.

Parks and recreation

Trails 
The city has a trail along the Highway 23 corridor leading to the Old Plank Road Trail to the west of Sheboygan that uses dedicated paths and bike lanes, along with a lakefront trail between Pennsylvania and Park avenues along Broughton Drive. Several bike routes are marked in the city using existing streets and roads to demarcate separate bike lanes.

A 2013 project created a north-south trail using the former Chicago & Northwestern Railroad right-of-way known as the "Shoreline 400" between Pennsylvania and North avenues, with future expansion to the south planned. A 2016 project added a trail along the Taylor Drive corridor, and improvements to the south to allow an eventual connection to the Ozaukee Interurban Trail are proposed for a future date.

Surfing
Sheboygan is a notable surfing destination, and has been called "The Malibu of the Midwest.” Sheboygan is considered to be one of the best places to surf in the Great Lakes region" Sheboygan hosted the annual Dairyland Surf Classic from 1988 to 2012, the largest lake surfing competition in the world. Sheboygan's surfing culture was discussed in the 2003 surfing documentary, Step into Liquid.

Government

Local government 
Sheboygan has a Mayor–Council form of government. The full-time mayor is elected by general election for a term of four years, with no term limits and to an officially non-partisan position. The Common Council consists of ten alderpersons representing the city's ten aldermanic districts with a council president and vice-president presiding over them. A City Administrator oversees the day-to-day administration of the city and is appointed by the Common Council.

Sheboygan's 1916-built City Hall was remodeled throughout 2018 and into 2019, being re-dedicated on September 3, 2019 with a new north frontage becoming the building's new main entrance and making the building's vintage three-story staircase its most prominent feature within a new atrium.
 
The Sheboygan Police Department is the law enforcement agency in the city. Civil and criminal law cases are heard in the Sheboygan County Circuit Court, with municipal citations for Sheboygan and Kohler handled through the city's municipal court within the police headquarters building. The Sheboygan Fire Department provides fire suppression and emergency medical services, operating out of five fire stations throughout the city.

State and federal representation 
Sheboygan is represented in the Wisconsin State Assembly as part of both the 26th (Terry Katsma, R–Oostburg) and 27th (Tyler Vorpagel, R–Plymouth) districts, whose boundaries split the city along Geele Avenue from the west until North 18th Street, then Superior Avenue from North 18th Street to Lake Michigan. The city is also represented in the State Senate as part of the 9th district (Devin LeMahieu, R–Oostburg).

Sheboygan is in the 6th congressional district of Wisconsin, which is represented by Republican congressperson Glenn Grothman.

Education

Sheboygan public schools are administered by the Sheboygan Area School District.

High schools
High schools within the city include:

 Sheboygan North High School
 Sheboygan South High School
 Sheboygan Area Lutheran High School
 Sheboygan County Christian High School
 George D. Warriner High School
 Sheboygan Christian School
 Étude High School
 Sheboygan Central High School

The school district was the first in Wisconsin to operate an FM radio station, WSHS (91.7). Since 1996, Sheboygan has had a high school program, Rockets for Schools, where students build and launch  rockets.

Colleges
 University of Wisconsin–Green Bay Sheboygan Campus
 Lakeshore Technical College (satellite campus)

Media

The city's daily newspaper is Gannett's The Sheboygan Press, which has been published since 1907. The Sheboygan Sun also provides local news coverage through its website, while the Beacon is published by the same company as The Plymouth Review and Sheboygan Falls News; the latter two have print editions mailed out weekly to all residents. The Gannett-owned Shoreline Chronicle contains Press "best-of" content, and is door-delivered and is also distributed with the Wednesday Press.

The city is served by television and radio stations in Green Bay and Milwaukee. Nielsen's television division places Sheboygan within the Milwaukee market, although Green Bay stations also report news, events, and weather warnings pertaining to Sheboygan and target the city with advertising.

Nielsen Audio places Sheboygan and Sheboygan County within one radio market, and several stations serve the area. Midwest Communications owns four stations within the county, including talk station WHBL (1330, with a translator station at 101.5 FM serving Sheboygan, Kohler and Sheboygan Falls); country station WBFM (93.7); CHR/Top 40 WXER (104.5 from Plymouth, with a translator at 96.1 FM in Sheboygan); and active rock Sheboygan Falls-licensed WHBZ (106.5). Another CHR station, WCLB (950, translated on 107.3) also serves the city, along with the Sheboygan Area School District's WSHS (91.7), a member of the Wisconsin Public Radio Ideas Network, and Plymouth's WGXI (1420, translated on 98.5), a classic country station.

Various religious stations originating from Milwaukee and north of Green Bay and a translator for Kiel's WSTM (91.3), and NOAA Weather Radio station WWG91 broadcast from several towers in the city. WYVM acts as a full-power relay of Suring's WRVN (102.7), which has a religious teaching format.

The city is served by Spectrum and U-verse, with public-access television cable TV programming provided to both systems from "WSCS", and "SASD-TV" features school board meetings, with both channels featuring meetings and other content through their websites and YouTube. The city at one time had a television station, WPVS-LP, which went off the air following the digital switchover and has since moved to Milwaukee; WHBL also attempted to establish a television sister station several times, without success.

Infrastructure

Transportation

Roads
Interstate 43 is the primary north-south transportation route into Sheboygan, and forms the west boundary of the city. U.S. Route 141 was the primary north-south route into Sheboygan before Interstate 43 was built, and its former route is a major north-south route through the center of the city that is referred to as Calumet Drive coming into the city from the north, and South Business Drive/Sauk Trail Road from the south; between Superior and Georgia Avenues, the highway is known as 14th Street. Four-lane Highway 23 is the primary west route into the city, and leads into the city up to North 25th Street as a freeway. Other state highways in the city include Highway 42, Highway 28, which both run mostly along the former inner-city routing of U.S. 141. Secondary county highways include County Trunk Highway DL (CTH-DL) and the decommissioned CTH-LS to the north; CTH-J, CTH-O, CTH-PP, and CTH-EE to the west; and CTH-KK to the south.

For addressing purposes, the city's north-south zero point is Pennsylvania Avenue (increasing from 500 past that line in both directions), while west addressing zeroes out at the extreme eastern point of Superior Avenue at Lake Michigan (Sheboygan and Sheboygan County have no east addresses, and the little land existing northeast of that point stretches out the six '100 blocks' northward with xx50-xx90 numbers not otherwise used in most other addresses in Sheboygan).

Public transit 
Shoreline Metro provides public bus transit throughout the city, as well as in Kohler and Sheboygan Falls. All routes depart from the Metro Center, more commonly known as the "Transfer Point" located in the downtown.

Jefferson Lines and Indian Trails serve Sheboygan at the Metro Center, providing transportation to Milwaukee (and an Amtrak Thruway connection to the Milwaukee Intermodal Station) and Green Bay.

Rail
Historically the city was connected to Milwaukee, Chicago and Green Bay via the Milwaukee Interurban Lines, the Chicago & North Western Railroad and the Milwaukee Road. These railroads' passenger services were abandoned during the mid-20th century but in 2008 the Wisconsin Department of Transportation proposed to reestablish passenger service to Milwaukee and Green Bay via Fond du Lac and the cities along Lake Winnebago's west shore, though political complications in the 2010s have since mothballed rail expansion in Wisconsin.

Airport
Sheboygan is served by the county-owned non-commercial Sheboygan County Memorial Airport (KSBM) three miles northwest of the city.

Water
Sheboygan is bounded on the east by Lake Michigan. The city has no active port in the 21st century. Blue Harbor Resort is located on a peninsula between the lake and the Sheboygan River's last bend. This site was formerly used as the headquarters of the C. Reiss Coal Company (now a Koch Industries division). It was their base of operations for ships to load and unload coal for delivery along the peninsula.

The Sheboygan River passes through the city, but dams in Sheboygan Falls prevent navigation upriver. Tall-masted boats are confined to the river downstream of the Pennsylvania Avenue bridge. Commercial charter fishing boats dock near the mouth of the river.

Hospitals

 Aurora Medical Center-Sheboygan County
 St. Nicholas Hospital

In July 2022, Aurora Health Care opened a modern replacement for Aurora Sheboygan Memorial Medical Center on Union Avenue east of I-43 on Kohler village land north of the Acuity Insurance campus otherwise inaccessible from Kohler proper itself without going through Sheboygan.

Notable people

 Peter Bartzen, Wisconsin State Representative
 James Baumgart, Wisconsin state senator
 Theodore Benfey, Wisconsin state senator
 Thomas M. Blackstock, politician and businessman
 Archie Bleyer, music director
 Helen Boatwright, opera singer and educator
 Vernon R. Boeckmann, Wisconsin State Representative and sheriff
 Ray Buivid, football player
 Charles Burhop, politician
 Elijah Fox Cook, Wisconsin state senator
 The Chordettes, singing quartet
 Valentine Detling, Wisconsin State Representative and businessman
 Sam Dekker, professional basketball player
 Ambrose Delos DeLand, Wisconsin legislator
 Fred A. Dennett, Wisconsin state senator
 John M. Detling, Wisconsin State Representative
 Theodore Dieckmann, Wisconsin legislator
 John Dittrich, NFL player
 Jerry Donohue, major contributor toward DNA identification
 Bill Dwyre, editor and columnist, Los Angeles Times
 John W. Eber, Speaker of the Wisconsin State Assembly
 Simon Gillen, Wisconsin State Representative and jurist
 Bernard O. Gruenke, artist
 Fred C. Haack, one of two first Socialist candidates (with August Mohr) elected to office in America
 Lorenzo D. Harvey, Superintendent of Public Instruction of Wisconsin
 Timothy Hasenstein, painter
 Joe Hauser, Major League Baseball player
 Herman Heinecke, Wisconsin state assembly
 Henry A. Hillemann, Wisconsin State Representative and lawyer
 Harrison Carroll Hobart, Union Army general
 William E. Hoehle, Wisconsin State Representative
 Curt W. Janke, Wisconsin State Representative
 Marvin John Jensen, U.S. Navy admiral
 John H. Jones, Wisconsin state senator
 Jacob Jung, Wisconsin State Representative and businessman
 William G. Kaufmann, politician and businessman
 Edward J. Kempf, Wisconsin State Representative
 Ernest Keppler, politician and jurist
 John J. Koepsell, Wisconsin State Representative and businessman
 John Michael Kohler, industrialist, founder of Kohler Company and mayor of Sheboygan
 Terry Jodok Kohler, industrialist
 Walter J. Kohler, Jr., Governor of Wisconsin
 Walter J. Kohler, Sr., Governor of Wisconsin
 Conrad Krez, Union Army general, Wisconsin State Representative
 Frederick W. Krez, Wisconsin State Representative
 Eloise Kummer, actress
 Imogen LaChance, social reformer 
 Wesley Lau, actor
 Joe Leibham, lobbyist and former Wisconsin State Senator
 Debbie Lesko, U.S. Representative from Arizona
 Frank J. Lingelbach, Wisconsin State Representative
 Rick Majerus, NCAA and NBA basketball coach
 Anthony Martin, escape artist
 Jackie Mason, comedian and actor
 Pat Matzdorf, high jump world record holder
 Don McNeill, radio host of "The Breakfast Club"
 Doxie Moore, former NBA head coach for the Sheboygan Red Skins
 Charles E. Morris, Wisconsin State Representative
 Martha Nause, golfer
 Otto C. Neumeister, Wisconsin State Representative
 Fred E. Nuernberg, Wisconsin State Representative
 William J. Nuss, Wisconsin State Representative
 Carl Otte, Wisconsin legislator
 Benjamin Hoskins Paddock, father of Stephen Paddock, perpetrator of the 2017 Las Vegas shooting
 Dennis T. Phalen, Wisconsin state senator
 Roy Pirrung, marathon runner and motivational speaker
 Cora Scott Pond Pope, teacher, scriptwriter, real estate developer
 Calvin Potter, Wisconsin state senator
 Valentine P. Rath, Wisconsin State Representative
 Henry Otto Reinnoldt, Wisconsin State Representative
 Wilbur M. Root, Wisconsin State Representative
 George Sauer, Jr., NFL player
 John Schneider, Jr., Wisconsin State Representative
 Bill Schroeder, football player (wide receiver)
 Bill Schroeder, professional football player (halfback)
 Carl Schuette, NFL player
 David N. Senty, U.S. Air Force Major General
 James McMillan Shafter, jurist and legislator
 E. E. Smith, science fiction author
 Horatio N. Smith, Wisconsin state senator
 Ernest A. Sonnemann, Wisconsin State Representative
 Adolphus Frederic St. Sure, judge
 David Taylor, judge
 Joseph M. Theisen, Wisconsin State Representative
 Michelle Tuzee, ABC news anchor, Los Angeles
 Edward Voigt, U.S. Representative
 Jacob Vollrath, industrialist
 Joseph Wedig, Wisconsin State Representative
 Gustavis A. Willard, Wisconsin State Representative
 William Te Winkle, Wisconsin state senator
 George W. Wolff, Wisconsin State Representative and senator
 Helen Sumner Woodbury Economist, academic, historian and public official
 Joshua Zickert Professional skateboarder, entrepreneur, stuntman
 Carl Zillier, Wisconsin State Representative

In popular culture 
 The Creature That Ate Sheboygan is a science fiction board game released in 1979 by Simulations Publications.

Sister cities
Sheboygan's sister cities are:

  Esslingen am Neckar, Baden-Württemberg, Germany
  Tsubame, Niigata, Japan

Sheboygan has student exchanges with Esslingen and has had student exchanges with Tsubame in the past.

See also
 Sheboygan Red Skins, an early professional basketball franchise of the NBA
 The Creature That Ate Sheboygan

References

Further reading
 Legacies of Firefighting: A History of the Sheboygan Fire Department, 1846–1998. Sheboygan, Wis.: Sheboygan Fire Department History Book Committee, 1998.
 Sheboygan. Charleston, S.C: Arcadia Pub, 2012.

External links

 City of Sheboygan
 Sheboygan County Chamber of Commerce
 Sanborn fire insurance maps: 1884 1887 1891 1903

 
Cities in Sheboygan County, Wisconsin
Cities in Wisconsin
County seats in Wisconsin
German-American culture in Wisconsin
Lake surfing
Wisconsin populated places on Lake Michigan
Surfing locations in the United States
Sundown towns in Wisconsin